Franciela das Graças Krasucki (born 26 April 1988 in Valinhos, São Paulo) is a Brazilian sprinter.

Career
She competed for the Brazilian team in the 4 × 100 metres relay at the 2012 Summer Olympics; the team set a South American record with a time of 42.55 in Round 1, then placed seventh in the final with a time of 42.91.

At the 2013 World Championships in Moscow, the team composed by Ana Cláudia Lemos, Evelyn dos Santos, Franciela Krasucki and Rosângela Santos broke the South American record in the semifinals of the women's 4x100m metres relay, with a time of 42.29 seconds. But, without official explanation, the CBAT (Brazilian Athletics Confederation) held an  athlete change to the final, putting Vanda Gomes instead of Rosângela Santos, to close the race. In the final, Brazil came second, almost tied with Jamaica and with great possibility to win the silver medal, and knock the South American record when, at the last exchange between Krasucki and Vanda, the baton fell eliminating the Brazilian team.

In February 2014, in São Caetano do Sul, she twice broke the South American record in the 60 metres, with a time of 7.23 seconds in the semifinals, and 7.19 in the final. The previous South American record holder was Esmeralda Garcia Freitas, established on March 13, 1981, in Pocatello, United States, with a time of 7.26.

Personal life
On January 21, 2012, she married 800 metres runner Kléberson Davide in Valinhos, São Paulo.

Personal bests
100 m: 11.13 (wind: -0.7 m/s) –  São Paulo, 6 June 2013
200 m: 22.76 (wind: -0.1 m/s) –  São Paulo, 9 June 2013

International competitions

References

External links

1988 births
Living people
People from Valinhos
Brazilian people of Polish descent
Brazilian female sprinters
Olympic athletes of Brazil
Athletes (track and field) at the 2012 Summer Olympics
Athletes (track and field) at the 2016 Summer Olympics
World Athletics Championships athletes for Brazil
Pan American Games gold medalists for Brazil
Pan American Games medalists in athletics (track and field)
South American Games gold medalists for Brazil
South American Games bronze medalists for Brazil
South American Games medalists in athletics
Athletes (track and field) at the 2011 Pan American Games
Athletes (track and field) at the 2019 Pan American Games
Pan American Games athletes for Brazil
Competitors at the 2010 South American Games
Competitors at the 2014 South American Games
Medalists at the 2011 Pan American Games
Troféu Brasil de Atletismo winners
Olympic female sprinters
Sportspeople from São Paulo (state)
21st-century Brazilian women